The 2020-21 season is Chonburi's 15th season in the Thai League T1 since 2006.

Players

Current squad
As of 4 February 2020

Out on loan

References

External links
 Chonburi F.C. Official Website
 Thai League Official Website

Chonburi F.C. seasons
Association football in Thailand lists
CBR